Djuvara or Juvara is a surname. Notable people with the surname include:

 Alexandru Djuvara (1858–1913), Romanian writer, journalist, and politician
 Ernest Juvara (1870–1933), Romanian surgeon
 Neagu Djuvara (1916–2018), Romanian historian

Aromanian-language surnames